İhsan Özkes (born 1 August 1957, Çorum), Turkish politician, and cleric.

Early life and education
He graduated from Ankara İmam Hatip Lisesi in 1976 and served as an imam in Alaca for some time. In 1981, he graduated from İstanbul Yüksek İslam Enstitüsü (Night section) Tafsir-Hadith in first place. During higher education, he served as a Qur'an teacher in Beyoğlu. He holds a master's degree in Hadith from Al-Azhar University.

Career 
In 1981, he was assigned as the mufti of Gerze. During 1983-1985, he served as the  Mufti of Sorgun, Yozgat. He was sent to Egypt by Diyanet İşleri Başkanlığı for a period of two years during when he earned master's degree in Hadith from Al-Azhar University in Cairo.
In 1987, he was appointed as the Mufti of Akçakoca, Bolu. After that, he got his MA degree at Marmara University's Divinity College, under Hadith section, whilst attending Diyanet's Haseki Education Center. 
While he was the Central Preacher of İstanbul, he was assigned as the Mufti of Üsküdar in 1992. Before the municipal elections in 1999, he left office to run for Üsküdar District Mayor with Democratic Left Party. After the elections he became the Mufti of Şile. Finally, in October 1999, he assumed office as the Mufti of Beyoğlu.
 
In December 2010, he was elected as a member of the Party Assembly of Republican People's Party (CHP). And in 2011 general elections, Ozkes was elected as CHP Deputy for İstanbul's 1st region. He ran for mayor of Uskudar during the 2014 Municipal Elections. He narrowed a 15% deficit (from 2011 elections) to about 2% and his dispute of the election results is currently at the Constitutional Court.

Ozkes was elected to the party council on September 6, 2014 with the highest number of votes. He is reelected as an MP for Istanbul in 2015 general elections.

Current and Recent Positions 
 CHP Deputy for Istanbul (1st Region)
 Member of CHP Party Assembly
 Member of Turkish PUIC Delegation

Stance On Current Debates in Turkey 

He claimed, asked on the debate on new abortion law proposal which is expected to restrict abortions, that "Islam is more permissive than Christianity" and that the issue is rather political than religious, and that the ruling party is trying to distract attentions from a recent governmental failure that caused killing of 35 villagers in Southeastern Turkey.

Duties as Mufti 
 Gerze, Sinop
 Sorgun, Yozgat
 Akçakoca, Bolu
 Üsküdar, İstanbul
 Şile, İstanbul
 Beyoğlu, İstanbul
 Yüreğir, Adana

Publications (Turkish) 
 Riyaz'üs-Salihin Terceme ve Şerhi (Translation of Riyadh as-Saaliheen with Commentary) 
 Peygamberimiz Döneminde Kadınlar (Women at the Time of Our Prophet)
 Oruç, Mübarek Geceler ve Bayramlar (Fasting, Religious Nights and Feasts)
 İnanç Sömürüsü İslam'a ve Uygarlığa Büyük Engeldir (Religious Exploitation is A Great Hindrance for Islam and Civilization)
 Siyasallaştırılan Din, Dinleştirilen Siyaset (Religion Politicized, Politics Religionized)  
 Daraltılan Din, Tartılan İman (Religion Narrowed, Faith Weighed)
 Emevi Siyaseti - Dinin Saltanata Dönüşmesi (Umayyad Politics - From Religion to Empire)

References

External links 
 
 CHP
 Turkish Great National Assembly (TBMM)
 Interview in Hurriyet Daily News 
 spiegel.de 

1957 births
Living people
People from Çorum
Republican People's Party (Turkey) politicians
Deputies of Istanbul
Imam Hatip school alumni
Members of the 25th Parliament of Turkey
Members of the 24th Parliament of Turkey